A Choice of Enemies is the third novel by Canadian author Mordecai Richler. It was first published in 1957 by André Deutsch.

Plot and setting
The novel is set in London in the 1950s. A group of dissident writers and filmmakers from Canada and the United States settle in England to escape the McCarthy era witch hunt.
Problems ensue after Norman Price, a former academic turned pulp writer, befriends a mysterious German refugee and is ostracized by the others. Their rigid idealism devolves into tyranny and Norman decides that "all alliances are discredited." He faces a personal dilemma where his choice of enemies is not clear.

Theme
Richler uses biting wit, pointed irony and elements of surrealism to construct a parable reflecting the moral doubt and decay of modern society.

New Canadian Library
1957 novels
Novels by Mordecai Richler
Novels set in London
Novels about writers
André Deutsch books